John Gray (born April 10, 1817, in Redruth, Cornwall, England) was an American politician. He was a member of the Wisconsin State Assembly during the 1877 and 1878 sessions. He was a Republican.

References

People from Redruth
American people of Cornish descent
British emigrants to the United States
1817 births
Year of death missing
Date of death missing
Republican Party members of the Wisconsin State Assembly